Ferok railway station (Code: FK) is a railway station in Kozhikode District, Kerala

Administration 
The station falls under the Palakkad railway division of the Southern Railway zone, Indian Railways.

Location
11 km from Kozhikode Town.
18 km From Calicut International Airport

Railway stations in Kozhikode district
Palakkad railway division